Reece James may refer to:
 Reece James (footballer, born 1993), English footballer born in Bacup, Lancashire
 Reece James (footballer, born 1999), English footballer born in Redbridge, London

See also
 Rhys James (born 1991), English comedian
 Reece Flanagan (born 1994), English footballer whose middle name is James